Sardab-e Pain (also Romanized as Sardāb-e Pā’īn; also known as Sardāb and Sardāb-e Soflá) is a village in Cheshmeh Langan Rural District, in the Central District of Fereydunshahr County, Isfahan Province, Iran. At the 2006 census, its population was 252, in 57 families.

References 

Populated places in Fereydunshahr County